Yaw Preko (born 8 September 1974 in Accra) is a former football striker from Ghana. He is currently the manager of Ghana U20.

Career 
His career started in Powerlines, a small Ghanaian club, and his first European club was R.S.C. Anderlecht where he became Belgian champion three times. He played in Turkey from 1997 to 2004 before joining Halmstads BK in the Allsvenskan. He then left Halmstads BK in 2005 as the club did not renew his contract, he signed for Saudi Arabian team Al-Ettifaq and stayed with them for almost 2 years and then signed for HAGL in the Vietnamese V-League, which he left after one season. A free agent, Preko subsequently announced his interest of returning home to the Ghanaian league.

International 
He has played 68 international matches for the Ghana national team, and was a member of the team that won the bronze medal at the 1992 Summer Olympics in Barcelona.

Coaching career
From December 2012 to July 2013, Preko was the assistant manager of Ghana's U20 national team. In October 2015, he became assistant manager under Kenichi Yatsuhashi. On 30 October 2016, he was appointed caretaker manager replacing Sergio Traguil. However, the club decided to appoint a new manager at the end of October 2018 and two weeks later, he was reunited with Kenichi Yatsuhashi at Nigerian club Ifeanyi Ubah still as assistant manager. Yatsuhashi was sacked already sacked on 12 December 2016 and once again, Preko took over as a caretaker manager and later permanent manager. In January 2018, he was appointed assistant manager for Ghana's U17 national team.

In April 2019, he was appointed assistant manager of Ghanaian club Kings Palace FC, again under Kenichi Yatsuhashi. In June 2019, he was appointed manager of Ghana's U20 national team.

References

External links 
 
 Yaw Preko swedish FA profile
 Yaw Preko to play in Vietnam
 Yaw Preko profile
 
 

1974 births
Living people
Ghanaian footballers
Ghana international footballers
Ghanaian expatriate footballers
Olympic footballers of Ghana
Allsvenskan players
R.S.C. Anderlecht players
Fenerbahçe S.K. footballers
Gaziantepspor footballers
Yimpaş Yozgatspor footballers
Halmstads BK players
Accra Hearts of Oak S.C. players
Olympic bronze medalists for Ghana
Footballers at the 1992 Summer Olympics
Footballers from Accra
Ghanaian expatriate sportspeople in Belgium
Ghanaian expatriate sportspeople in Vietnam
Ghanaian expatriate sportspeople in Sweden
Ghanaian expatriate sportspeople in Turkey
Ghanaian expatriate sportspeople in Saudi Arabia
Expatriate footballers in Turkey
Expatriate footballers in Sweden
Expatriate footballers in Vietnam
Expatriate footballers in Belgium
Süper Lig players
Belgian Pro League players
1992 African Cup of Nations players
1996 African Cup of Nations players
2000 African Cup of Nations players
Olympic medalists in football
Ettifaq FC players
Hoang Anh Gia Lai FC players
V.League 1 players
Medalists at the 1992 Summer Olympics
Association football forwards
Saudi Professional League players
Accra Great Olympics F.C. managers
Ghana Premier League managers